A negative repetition (negative rep) is the repetition of a technique in weight lifting in which the lifter performs the eccentric phase of a lift. Instead of pressing the weight up slowly, in proper form, a spotter generally aids in the concentric, or lifting, portion of the repetition while the lifter slowly performs the eccentric phase for 3–6 seconds.

Function 
Negative reps are used to improve both muscular strength and power in subjects, this is commonly known as hypertrophy training.

Due to its mechanical properties, this form of training can be used for both healthy individuals and individuals who are in rehabilitation. Studies have shown that negative repetitions or "eccentric phase training" combines a high amount of force on the muscle with a lower energy cost than normal concentric training, which requires 4–5 times the amount of energy. This justifies why this type of training is more beneficial and less of a risk to subjects rehabilitating or with a limited exercise capacity.

History 
Eccentric training is often associated with the terms "muscles soreness" and "muscle damage". In 1902, Theodore Hough discovered and developed the term DOMS (delayed onset muscle soreness), after he found that exercises containing negative repetitions caused athletes to have sore muscles. Hough believed this was causing a rupture within the muscle; when he looked further into the subject, he found that when performing eccentric exercise that exhibited soreness, the muscle "quickly adapts and becomes accustomed to the increase in applied stress". The result of this was that the muscles' soreness not only decreased, but the muscular damage did too.

Health benefits for the elderly 
It has been proven that eccentric resistance training improves the functional mobility of older adults. Studies have shown that eccentric training of the lower body, in particular the knee extensors, are essential in preventing falls in older adults and helping them maintain their independence.

A study conducted focusing on eccentric training for the age group 65–87 years of age showed that, over 12 weeks, they had strengthened their knee extensors by up to 26%. With this evidence, it is reasonable to suggest that negative repetitions can help improve the health of older adults.

Treatment of Tendinopathy 
Studies have shown that eccentric training may be successful in the treatment of certain tendonitis. Studies have shown that the use of eccentric training for twelve weeks may be an alternative to therapy for people suffering from Patellar Tendinopathy (Jumper's Knee). Eccentric training has also been proven successful in the treatment of chronic Achilles tendonitis, using a twelve-week eccentric calf muscle program various studies have shown the ability for people to return to normal pre-tendonitis levels. The reasoning behind the benefits of eccentric training for tendinopathy is still unclear.

References

External links
 
 
 Heavy negatives are positively a good idea

Weight training exercises
Strength training
Physical exercise